is a 2005 film adaptation of Yukio Mishima's novel of the same name, directed by Isao Yukisada.

The cast includes Satoshi Tsumabuki as Kiyoaki Matsugae, Yūko Takeuchi as Satoko Ayakura, and Sosuke Takaoka as Shigekuni Honda.

The film was nominated for nine Japanese Academy Awards. "Be My Last", the main theme song for this film, was performed by Hikaru Utada. This was her 14th Japanese-language single release.

Plot
Spring Snow starts in 1912, as Emperor Taishō begins his reign and Japan's upper classes (kazoku) are mimicking the tastes and manners of Europe's aristocrats. Among them are two children, Kiyoaki Matsugae (Satoshi Tsumabuki) who is the only son of the Marquess Matsugae and Satoko Ayakura (Yūko Takeuchi) who is the only daughter of the Earl Ayakura.

Even as a child, Satoko had romantic aspirations for her friendship with Kiyoaki. However, her father (Kenjirō Ishimaru), wary of the womanizing ways of Kiyoaki's father (Takaaki Enoki), fears for his daughter's involvement. He instructs her tutor, Tadeshina (Michiyo Ōkusu), to ensure the girl's heart is not broken.

A decade later, as Kiyoaki is finishing Gakushūin high school, the beautiful and eligible Satoko is still stuck on her childhood sweetheart. To avoid her, Kiyoaki playfully considers setting her up with his uptight school friend, Shigekuni Honda (Sousuke Takaoka), and writes a lurid confession of frequent trips to Tokyo's entertainment (the theatre of Goethe's Faust) quarter, then posts the letter to Satoko before Shigekuni can stop him. That evening, Kiyoaki has second thoughts, and requests the letter be destroyed, as his decadent adventures were fabrications.

External links 
 Official site

2005 films
Films based on Japanese novels
Films based on works by Yukio Mishima
Films directed by Isao Yukisada
Films scored by Taro Iwashiro
Films set in the Taishō period
2000s Japanese films